HMS Bustler was launched at Topsham in 1805. The French captured her in 1808 when she stranded and attempts to set fire to her failed. The French Navy took her into service as Bustler. The British recaptured her in 1813 when attempts by her crew to scuttle her failed. The Royal Navy did not take her into service and her subsequent disposition is currently obscure.

Royal Navy
In February 1806 Bustler was under the command of Lieutenant Richard Welch. The gunbrigs Bustler, and  shared in the proceeds from the capture on 13 August 1806 of Experiencia.

In 1807 Lieutenant Edward Morris was in temporary command until Lieutenant Welch returned to command.

Blazer, Bustler, and  shared in the proceeds of the detention on 27 August 1807 of Hausstind, Auroe, master. Blazer, Bustler, and  shared in the proceeds when their boats detained Eos and Amicitia on 28 August.

That same month Blazer, Bustler, and Furious detained Rosenora.

On 1 June 1808 Bustler, under Welch's command, captured the French schooner Deux Guillaume and the boats Felix and Bien Venu.

Capture: On 26 December 1808 Bustler was cruising off the north coast of France when she ran aground in thick weather. As the tide went out she fell on her side. As the weather cleared it was found that she was about two hundred yards from Cape Gris-Nez. Welch put Bustlers boats into the water to pull her off, but a shore battery started an accurate fire on her. Welch ordered most of the crew aboard the boats, which took them off. He stayed behind with a small party to set fire to her. The cutter Nymphe came up and picked up the crew. Welch and his men  set fire to Bustler and then rowed to the cutter. When the fire appeared to go out Nymphe attempted to return to Bustler, but luggers and gunboats could be seen approaching from Calais and Boulogne and the British gave up and sailed off. The subsequent court martial blamed the grounding on negligence by the master and pilot. It ordered them dismissed the service, mulcted of all pay, and to be imprisoned for a year.

French Navy
The French Navy purchased Bustler on 18 March 1809 and commissioned her, without change of name, at Boulogne on 16 April. She was stationed in the waters of Escault and at Vlissingen, and moored at Antwerp from April 1810.

On 8 December 1813 , under the command of Captain Lord George Stuart, and  captured the island of Schowen during the Dutch uprising. The two British ships landed a small joint force of marines and seamen, who met no opposition as the French surrendered first. In addition to prisoners, guns, and arms, the British re-captured a French gunboat and a brig of 14 guns that turned out to be Bustler. Bustler had been serving as station ship at Zierikzee, the capital of Schowen.  was in company.

Fate
Bustlers subsequent disposition is currently uncertain, though she may have fallen into the hands of the Dutch.

Notes

Citations

References
 
 
  
 

1805 ships
Brigs of the Royal Navy
Captured ships
Brigs of the French Navy